The men's 400 metres event at the 2003 IAAF World Indoor Championships was held on March 14–16.

Medalists

Results

Heats
First 2 of each heat (Q) and next 4 fastest (q) qualified for the semifinals.

Semifinals
First 2 of each semifinal (Q) qualified directly for the final.

Final

References
Results

400
400 metres at the World Athletics Indoor Championships